The 1995 Washington Huskies football team was an American football team that represented the University of Washington during the 1995 NCAA Division I-A football season.  In its third season under head coach Jim Lambright, the team compiled a 7–4–1 record, finished in a tie with USC for first place in the Pacific-10 Conference, and outscored its opponents 312 

Quarterback Damon Huard was selected as the team's most valuable player. Ernie Conwell, Deke Devers, Stephen Hoffmann, and Richard Thomas were the team captains. After two years of bowl probation, the Huskies returned to the postseason at the Sun Bowl, but fell to Iowa.

The Huskies' helmet color was changed to purple this year; it returned to metallic gold in 1999. The AstroTurf of Husky Stadium was replaced prior to the 1995 season; it was replaced with infilled FieldTurf in 2000.

Schedule

Roster

Game summaries

Arizona State

Ohio State

Army

Oregon State

Notre Dame

Stanford

Arizona

USC

Oregon

UCLA

Washington State

1995 Sun Bowl

NFL Draft
Three Huskies were selected in the 1996 NFL Draft, which was seven rounds, with 254 selections.

Source:

Quarterback Damon Huard was undrafted, but played twelve seasons in the NFL.

References

Washington
Washington Huskies football seasons
Pac-12 Conference football champion seasons
Washington Huskies football